LA Plaza de Cultura y Artes, also called LA Plaza is a Mexican-American museum and cultural center in Los Angeles, California, USA that opened in April 2011. The museum contains interactive exhibits designed by experience design expert Tali Krakowsky such as a reconstruction of a 1920s Main Street. The museum shares the stories of the history, cultures, values, and traditions of Mexicans, Mexican Americans, and all Latinos in Los Angeles and Southern California. The museum programs include exhibitions, educational programs, and public programming.

The museum is near Olvera Street in the El Pueblo de Los Angeles Historic District, also called El Pueblo. It is next to La Iglesia de Nuestra Señora Reina de los Angeles, also called La Placita or Plaza Church. The buildings are from the 1880s, some of the oldest in the city, the Vickrey-Brunswig Building and the Plaza House (1883).

It is owned by Los Angeles County which also owns Los Angeles County Museum of Art and others. For a time after its founding, LA Plaza struggled with financial problems; Donations and grants were expected to surpass $3.5 million in 2017.

A walkway is used to display large outdoors sculptures.

History

Construction
County Supervisor Gloria Molina was called "one of the project's earliest supporters and, by all accounts, the person most responsible for bringing it to fruition" by the Los Angeles Times. Part of the cost was funded by Molina's county discretionary spending funds. It was designed by Chu+Gooding Architects.

The rehabilitation of the shell and core of the historic Plaza House and Vickrey-Brunswig Building was completed in December 2009. The LA Plaza de Cultura y Artes Foundation completed tenant improvements to the two buildings and relocated their administrative offices to the fifth floor of the Vickrey-Brunswig Building in October 2010.

In October 2010, human remains were discovered from an old cemetery during excavations for an outdoor garden walkway and fountain. 118 bodies were removed before community concerns about the possible Native American origin of the remains and poor archaeological handling halted the construction in January 2011. Referring to an Environmental Impact Report conducted by Sapphos Environmental, Gloria Molina said "Had they done better work, we wouldn't be in this situation." Remains were taken to the Los Angeles County Museum of Natural History.

A public artwork, Walls Against Walls, is a chunk of the Berlin Wall containing a letter to President Donald Trump about how walls always come down. It has traveled the country since being brought to Washington D.C. in November 2019.

Operation

A $135-million development of 341 apartments with shops and community facilities near the cultural center provides funding for nonprofit foundation that runs LA Plaza de Cultura y Artes. The project was approved in 2014 along with a deal with the county Board of Supervisors to lease the parcel to the foundation for a dollar who then sublets it to the developer. The site had two public parking lots so the county no longer gets that income but does get property tax revenues from the development.

The project includes a pedestrian oriented arcade facing Spring Street that incorporates prominent access to the LA Plaza Paseo, which connects the parcels to LA Plaza and Union Station. The layout facilitates pedestrian access to Fort Moore and Grand Park on Hill Street. With this project, the revitalization of downtown Los Angeles appears to be reaching the area around Union Station and Olvera Street.

References

External links
 
 

Art museums and galleries in Los Angeles
Buildings and structures in Downtown Los Angeles
Ethnic museums in California
Museums in Los Angeles
Mexican-American culture in Los Angeles
County government agencies in California
Museums established in 2011
2011 establishments in California
El Pueblo de Los Ángeles Historical Monument
Latino museums in the United States